Cinema Veeran is a 2017 Indian Tamil-language documentary film written and directed by Aishwarya Rajinikanth on her documentary film debut.

Production 
The plot of the film was inspired and based on the lives of untold stories of stunt choreographers of Tamil cinema. The film also features a voice-over provided by Rajinikanth and it is produced by Dhanush under the production banner Wunderbar Films. The principal photography began in late December 2015 and the first look poster was unveiled in February 2016.

Release 
It was released through Hotstar on 21 June 2017.

Reception 
The film opened to mixed reviews from critics. Hemanth Kumar of Firstpost wrote "Cinema Veeran leaves you choked with emotion and it also makes a strong case for providing better facilities to stuntmen, who fiddle with danger on a daily basis". Behindwoods wrote "The documentary will definitely leave you with a significant impact. It might even make you feel guilty of not recognizing their effort, even for a second. Probably the industry and the society might look at them differently one day and give them the credit and reward they truly deserve."

References

External links

2017 documentary films
2017 films
Indian documentary films